Gaglardi is a surname. Notable people with the surname include:

 Phil Gaglardi (1913–1995), Canadian politician
 Tom Gaglardi (born 1967), Canadian business executive

See also
 Gagliardi